Artins is a commune in the Loir-et-Cher department in central France.

Population

History
The name derives from the Gallo-Roman Artinis.

The historic Romanesque church, dedicated to Saint Julien (of Le Mans), at a ford in the Loir river, fell into ruins when development occurred nearer a departmental route at a site known as Le Plat d'Etain. It has since been restored by local initiative for cultural purposes.

Popular tradition would have it that Artins is older than Le Mans (the ecclesiastical centre of the diocese to which Artins formerly belonged) and that St. Julien evinced a dragon who had taken up residence in a temple (which was replaced by the former church). A pilgrimage celebrating this feat survived into the mid-twentieth century.

The hillside is marked by a former Commanderie and the manor of Rocheturpin (which lost its Romanesque chapel in the late nineteenth century).  Just below these and above the Plat d'Etain is the present neo-gothic church. The lower hillside is marked by a series of caves often used as wine-cellars.

See also
Communes of the Loir-et-Cher department

References

Communes of Loir-et-Cher